Khrystoforivka is an urban-type settlement in Kryvyi Rih Raion of Dnipropetrovsk Oblast in Ukraine. It is located on the left bank of the Bokovenka in the drainage basin of the Dnieper. It belongs to Lozuvatka rural hromada, one of the hromadas of Ukraine. Population:

Economy

Transportation

Khrystoforivka has access to Highway H11 connects Kryvyi Rih with Mykolaiv and Highway H23 connecting Kryvyi Rih with Kropyvnytskyi.

References

Urban-type settlements in Kryvyi Rih Raion